Rascel-Fifì is a 1957 Italian crime-comedy film directed by . It is a parody of  Jules Dassin's Rififi. The film was a success at the Italian box office.

Plot 
Renato and Gideone team up in business and open a Night in one of the worst and infamous neighborhoods in New York, provoking the ire of Gionata a gangster owner of a nightclub right in front of Renato's, the boss will open a series of actions to close the competitors' business, first by sending a dancer, Barbara, who, performing in a risqué show, tries to get the police to intervene, then with the kidnapping of Renatino, son of Renato, to blackmail his father.

Renatino proves to be smarter than he seems, challenges Gionata to the dice and beats him, making him lose all the money and also the club.

Michaela, daughter of the bandit, has in the meantime fallen in love with Renato and helps him find her son, everything will end in a marriage and Gionata will pass, with her accomplices, in Renato's service.

Cast 

Renato Rascel: Renato
Annie Fratellini: Michaela 
Dario Fo: Pupo aka "The Blonde"
Franca Rame: Barbara
Peppino De Martino: Gedeone
Carlo Hintermann: Tre Dita
Riccardo Cucciolla: Undici  
Gino Buzzanca: Gionata
Enzo Garinei: The Prince
Antonella Steni: TV Presenter
Zoe Incrocci: Miss Patrick
Gisella Sofio: Woman at the phone
Ignazio Leone: Pennsylvania Bill

References

External links

1957 films
1950s crime comedy films
Italian crime comedy films
Films directed by Guido Leoni
1957 comedy films
1950s Italian films